Segalstad bru is the administrative centre of Gausdal Municipality in Innlandet county, Norway. The village is located at the crossroad between Østre Gausdal and Vestre Gausdal.

The village is named Segalstad bru which literally translates to Segalstad bridge. The village got its name from the actual bridge which links the two parts of the municipality on either side of the river.

Economy
A number of business and shops are located at Segalstad bru, the most significant of which is the timber company, Gausdal Bruk. Moreover, Segalstad bru is home to Fjerndum primary school, Gausdal Secondary school, the municipal administration building, and some sports facilities.
 
There is a large dairy just outside of Segalstad bru which is one of Norway's biggest producers of brunost, a type of Norwegian goat cheese. The dairy is part of the Q-Meieriene company in 2000.

History
On 26-27 April 1940, during Operation Weserübung during World War II, Segalstad bru was the site of a major battle in which several men lost their lives.

References

Gausdal
Villages in Innlandet